Ulsan College is a private college with two campuses in Ulsan, South Korea. The East Campus is in Dong-gu and the West Campus in Nam-gu. It was founded on 8 April 1960 as the Ulsan Industrial Technology Institute. Hyundai Heavy Industries is the college's owner and financial sponsor.

History 
The Ulsan Industrial Technology Institute was founded as an affiliate of the College of Engineering at the University of Ulsan. The opening ceremony for the first school year was on 10 March 1973. The college was renamed the Ulsan Industrial Technical College on 1 March 1985, then renamed Ulsan College on 11 November 1998. The East Campus was opened on 17 March 2000.

Academics 
The college's four departments currently offer the following programs. All programs are offered at the East Campus, except where noted.

Engineering 
 Environment & Building Design (3-year program)
 Information Technology (3-year program)
 Digital Content Design
 Mechanical Engineering (3-year program, West Campus)
 Electricity & Electronics (3-year program, West Campus)
 Industrial Management (West Campus)
 Environmental & Chemical Industry (West Campus)

Liberal arts and science 
 Early Childhood Education (3-year program)
 Social Welfare
 Tax Accounting
 Distribution Management
 Business & Foreign Languages

Natural science 
 Nursing (4-year program)
 Physical Therapy (3-year program)
 Dental Hygiene (3-year program)
 Food & Nutrition (3-year program)
 Hotel Food Service & Culinary Arts

Sports and leisure 
 Athletic Training

Notable people 
 Jung Jung-suk (정정숙), a former South Korean women's football player, attended Ulsan College
 Jun Min-kyung (전민경), a South Korean women's football goalkeeper, attended Ulsan College
 Kim Ki-hoon (김기훈), a retired short track speed skater and Olympic gold medal, is a professor at Ulsan College
  (김순자), an independent candidate in the 2012 South Korean legislative election, previously worked as a manager of the Korean Confederation of Trade Unions at Ulsan College
  (문소리), a South Korean football goalkeeper who won a bronze medal at the 2010 Asian Games, attended Ulsan College

See also 

 List of universities and colleges in South Korea

References

External links 
 Home page
 Home page 

Universities and colleges in Ulsan
Nam District, Ulsan
Educational institutions established in 1960
1960 establishments in South Korea